The Hunting of the Hawk is a 1917 American silent mystery film directed by George Fitzmaurice and starring William Courtenay. It was distributed by Pathé Exchange.

It is an incomplete surviving film with reels in the Library of Congress and National Archives of Canada (Ottawa). Prints and/or fragments were found in the Dawson Film Find in 1978.

Cast
William Courtenay as Desselway
Marguerite Snow as Diana Curran
Robert Clugston as Wrenshaw

References

External links

1917 films
American silent feature films
Films directed by George Fitzmaurice
American mystery films
American black-and-white films
1917 mystery films
1910s American films
Silent mystery films
1910s English-language films